Hamburger disease may refer to:
Hemolytic uremic syndrome: a disease caused by E. coli O157:H7
Hemorrhagic colitis: a precursor to hemolytic uremic syndrome
Proliferative gill disease